Jakub Kowalewski (born 16 June 1994) is a Polish luger. He competed in the men's doubles event at the 2018 Winter Olympics.

References

External links
 

1994 births
Living people
Polish male lugers
Olympic lugers of Poland
Lugers at the 2018 Winter Olympics
Lugers at the 2022 Winter Olympics
People from Jelenia Góra
Lugers at the 2012 Winter Youth Olympics